Balcatta is a suburb of Perth, Western Australia. Its local government area is the City of Stirling. It is a primarily middle-class suburb made up of mainly Italian, Greek and Macedonian  families, as well as many families from other European countries. It is also one of the largest suburbs in the northern part of the Perth metropolitan area. Much of Balcatta is a commercial and industrial area.

History 

Balcatta's name was derived from the Aboriginal words "Bal" meaning "his" and "Katta" meaning "hill".

The area became popular with Southern European migrant families, because it was one of the few areas that had not been settled and many migrant families wanted to build their own homes in their distinctive style, many complete with plaster figurines of lions and romanesque style columns adorning the front verandah and entry. Similarly, other European immigrant families had already settled in nearby suburbs such as Osborne Park, and made their living as market gardeners.

The area was especially popular with Macedonian families, leading to the establishment of Macedonian Cultural Centre "Ilinden" on Grindleford Place. Balcatta was also a popular area among other peoples from the Balkans.

As many of the older families pass on and others choose to update by building a newer home further north, the area is becoming increasingly popular with those of Asian cultural background, which has also led to some parts of Balcatta being subdivided into small units or villas.

Areas of interest

Jones Street
The longest street in Balcatta. Winding through the locality, Jones Street has had repeated work done by the local council to resurface it out and make it safer for both pedestrians and motorists. A number of new round-abouts have been constructed in order to slow down traffic at various points on the road. Jones Street also runs past Takari Primary School and ends at Delawney Street behind the Water Corporation Depot and Stirling Recycling Plant.

Amelia Street
This hilly street runs east to west through Balcatta. It also goes past one side of Balcatta Senior High School.

Balcatta Senior High School 

Balcatta Senior High School (BSHS) is the only public high school in Balcatta. A large percentage of its students are from non-Anglo Australian backgrounds. The school has specialist programs in the arts, such as dance and drama. BSHS was opened in 1967 and at the time was the northernmost school in the Perth metropolitan area.

Jones Paskin Reserve
This is a large oval mainly utilised in the summer as a cricket oval and for general use by the local community. This is the home ground of the Balcatta Cricket Club.

References

External links

Suburbs of Perth, Western Australia
Suburbs in the City of Stirling